The Fairey Spearfish was a British carrier-based, single-engined, torpedo bomber/dive bomber that was ordered from Fairey Aviation for the Fleet Air Arm during World War II. Designed during the war, the prototype did not fly until July 1945. Much larger than earlier naval bombers, it was designed for use aboard the large s that were cancelled after the war and was itself cancelled thereafter. Seven prototypes were ordered, but only five were built, of which four actually flew. They were mostly used for experimental work until the last aircraft was scrapped in 1952.

Design and development
The Spearfish was designed by Fairey Aviation to Admiralty Specification O.5/43 as a replacement for the Fairey Barracuda in the torpedo/dive bomber role. In comparison to the Barracuda, the Spearfish had a much more powerful engine, an internal weapons bay and a retractable ASV Mk.XV surface-search radar mounted behind the bomb bay. The Spearfish was half as large again as the Barracuda, as it was designed to be operated from the  Malta-class aircraft carriers then under development.

In August 1943, the company received an order for three prototypes to be built against Specification O.5/43 and the first prototype, serial number RA356, was constructed at Fairey's Hayes factory and first flew on 5 July 1945 from Heston Aerodrome; the other two did not fly until 1947. In November 1943 the company was ordered to build a dual-control dive-bombing trainer variant against Specification T.21/43 and this was built at the Heaton Chapel factory and assembled and flown at Ringway on 20 June 1946. Three further development aircraft were ordered in May 1944 to be built at Heaton Chapel, with the last two to be fitted with a Rolls-Royce Pennine engine; only the first Centarus-engined aircraft was built but never flew.

Production orders for 150 aircraft were placed to be built at Heaton Chapel; the first ten aircraft were intended to use  Bristol Centaurus radial engine, Centaurus 59 engines on the next 22, and Centaurus 60s of the remainder. In addition, the flaps were to be enlarged and lateral control was to be provided by spoilers with small "feeler" ailerons. With the cancellation of the Malta-class carriers, the Fleet Air Arm no longer had a requirement for new torpedo bombers and the programme was cancelled. Work continued on the two other prototypes built at Hayes after the cancellation of the contract, albeit very slowly.

In bad weather a pilot circling a carrier while waiting to land would have been forced to fly such a wide circuit that he could not always keep the carrier in sight. The later prototypes had ailerons boosted by hydraulic power and artificial feel to the stick from a spring, as an interim measure but Brown found "the second prototype was much less the pleasant aircraft to fly as the stick continually hunted either side of neutral and there was no build up of stick force with increase in speed." The Spearfish lacked any sort of stall warning, which would have been a problem in operational use as the stall and approach speeds were fairly close. For the landing, the aircraft proved quite docile.

The first prototype was later used by Napier & Son at Luton for trials of the firm's inflight de-icing systems. It was then briefly used for ground-training purposes beginning on 30 April 1952, until it was scrapped shortly afterwards. The second prototype was used by the Royal Navy Carrier Trials Unit at RNAS Ford, Sussex, until it was sold for scrap on 15 September. The third prototype conducted ASV Mk.XV radar trials, but was damaged in a heavy landing on 1 September 1949 and sold for scrap on 22 August 1950 as uneconomical to repair. The fourth prototype never flew and was used as a source of spares. The sole Heaton Chapel-built aircraft was the closest to the planned production configuration and it was used for engine-cooling and power-assisted flying-control trials, until it was struck off charge on 24 July 1951.

In a follow-up, to meet Specification O.21/44 for a two-seat strike fighter, the Spearfish was redesigned to accommodate a twin-coupled Rolls-Royce Merlin engine and contra-rotating propellers. A variety of other engines were considered and although a production order was placed for three examples in 1944, the programme was eventually shelved, remaining as an unfulfilled paper project.

Description
The Spearfish was a cantilever, mid-wing monoplane, with an all-metal, monocoque fuselage. The centre wing section was built integral with the fuselage and the outer wing panels could be hydraulically folded for carrier operations. A distinguishing feature of the wing was the large Fairey-Youngman flaps that spanned 73.5% of the wing's trailing edge. The Spearfish had an outward-retracting conventional landing gear with a tailwheel. The two-man tandem cockpit had a hydraulically operated canopy.

The large internal weapons bay could alternatively carry up to four  bombs, four depth charges, a torpedo, or a  auxiliary fuel tank. The Spearfish was intended to carry four 0.5-inch (12.7 mm) M2 Browning machine guns, two in a remote-controlled Fraser-Nash FN 95 barbette behind the cockpit and two in the wings. The only external offensive armament was 16 RP-3 rockets that could be carried underneath the outer wing panels.

Operators

 Royal Navy, Fleet Air Arm

Specifications (Spearfish)

See also

References

Notes

Bibliography
 Brown, Eric. "The Spearfish ... A Misconceived Welterweight". Air International, Vol. 14:1, January 1978, pp. 20–25 ISSN 0306-5634
 Buttler, Tony. British Experimental Combat Aircraft of World War II: Prototypes, Research Aircraft and Failed Production Designs. Manchester, UK: Hikoki Publications, 2012. 
 Chorlton, Martin (editor). Fairey — Company Profile 1915–1960. Cudham, Kent, UK: Kelsey Publishing, 2012. 
 Sturtivant, Ray. Fleet Air Arm Fixed-Wing Aircraft Since 1946. Air-Britain, 2004. 
 Taylor, H. A. Fairey Aircraft Since 1915. Annapolis, Maryland:  Naval Institute Press, 1988 [1974].

External links

 Fleet Air Arm Archive
 Two pictures of a Spearfish
 Flight, 14 February 1946, pages a–d, 169–69 (permanent dead link)

1940s British bomber aircraft
Carrier-based aircraft
1940s British anti-submarine aircraft
Spearfish
Single-engined tractor aircraft
Mid-wing aircraft
Aircraft first flown in 1945